NBA Live 09, sometimes called NBA Live 2009, is the 2008 installment in the NBA Live series, developed and published by Electronic Arts. The original release date was October 7, 2008. The game features Tony Parker of the San Antonio Spurs on the cover in most markets. The Wii version of the game, developed by HB Studios, is titled NBA Live 09 All-Play and launched under EA Sports' new All-Play brand exclusive to the platform. This was the final NBA Live game released for the Wii as well as the final game in the series to be generally available on a Nintendo platform.

Cover
While Parker appears on the cover in the US and most international markets, some international versions feature players from those areas:
UK and Ireland: Luol Deng
Italy: Andrea Bargnani (also appeared on the Italian cover of NBA Live 08)
Spain: Pau Gasol (has appeared on the Spanish cover of all the versions since NBA Live 06)

Features

Dynamic DNA
Dynamic DNA is a new feature in NBA Live 09 for the PlayStation 2, PlayStation 3, Xbox 360, and Wii, though it is not available for the PlayStation Portable. It breaks down how a team scores, sets up offense and how individual players go about on offense. It also updates players accessories, haircuts, facial hair changes and shoes. It is updated daily through NBA Live 365. It has been claimed that this new feature adds a more realistic feel to the gameplay featured.

NBA LIVE 365
NBA Live 365 is an addition to the NBA Live franchise. An update is downloadable every three or four months, updating player trades/injured players.

Live Rewind
The gamer can replay previous games with the updated statistical data that recreates identical conditions including injuries, hot/cold streaks, tendencies, and player DNA. If the game player does not have internet the gamer can still play games from the playoffs of the 2007–08 season.

Pick-and-Roll Control
This new two-man game mechanic lets you control both the ball handler and the screener, as you set screens and run two man plays, with on court instructions popping up to guide you through each play.

5-on-5 Online Play
Up to 5 players on each team for each starting position are user controlled. Club play allows your set team to play against other teams in a league type game as you gain rankings and move up divisions for each win. It is also possible to play on team play without a club.

Quickstrike Anklebreakers
A defender can be forced to step up and guess what the player will do next. Players can trigger the turbo button and use the right analog stick for ball-handling moves to fake out their defenders and create scoring opportunities.

Lockdown Defense
This feature allows a player to stay with his opponent the whole way and cause a turnover or bad shot.

Signature Play Calling
An in-game play calling system has been introduced. Linked to LIVE 365, this feature will suggest authentic plays for NBA's stars to run on the court. The gamer can bring up plays by pressing a button and tendencies of the player successfully completing that move will be displayed. The players who will be shown on the play calling menu can be changed by changing it in the options menu e.g. if the gamer has Ben Wallace doing a post-up move, it can be changed to LeBron James doing an off-the-ball screen.

Expanded FIBA teams
There are now 24 FIBA teams compared to NBA Live 08, which only had 8. An international tournament using authentic FIBA rosters and teams is available.

Reception

The Xbox 360 and PlayStation 3 versions received "generally favorable reviews", while the PSP, PlayStation 2, and Wii versions received "mixed" reviews, according to video game review aggregator Metacritic.  In Japan, Famitsu gave the game a score of three eights and one nine for the PS3 and Xbox 360 versions; all four sevens for the PSP version; and two sevens, one six, and one seven for the PS2 version.

GameSpot nominated the game for the dubious honor of Least Improved Sequel in its 2008 video game awards (the award went to Animal Crossing: City Folk).

See also
NBA 2K9

References

External links
EA Sports official website
NBA Live 09 official website
NBA Live 09 achievements

2008 video games
Electronic Arts games
HB Studios games
Mobile games
Multiplayer and single-player video games
NBA Live
Nintendo Wi-Fi Connection games
PlayStation 2 games
PlayStation 3 games
PlayStation Portable games
Video games developed in Canada
Video games set in 2008
Video games set in 2009
Wii Wi-Fi games
Xbox 360 games